Billy Kearns (17 February 1923 – 28 November 1992) was an American actor.

Biography
During World War II, Kearns fought in the Army's newly founded 10th Mountain Division created for fighting in mountainous areas. His acting career took place almost entirely in France, acting often in minor roles in TV films or on motion pictures, as soon as an American or British character was required for the cast.

He is best known for portraying fictional character Bill Ballantine in the 1965 TV series Bob Morane.

Partial filmography

The Roots of Heaven (1958) - Sarcastic Man in Bar (uncredited)
Un témoin dans la ville (1959) - Le soldat américain
Two Men in Manhattan (1959) - L'homme de la sécurité à la Ridgewood Tavern
Monsieur Robinson Crusoe (1960)
Purple Noon (1960) - Freddy Miles
 Women Are Like That (1960) - Charlie Ribban
La Fête espagnole (1961) - Kunk
Three Faces of Sin (1961) - Un client
A Touch of Treason (1962) - Mike Slatter
A Monkey in Winter (1962) - Un automobiliste (uncredited)
The Elusive Corporal (1962) - Un garde / Guard (uncredited)
Five Miles to Midnight (1962) - Capt. Wade
The Trial (1962) - First Assistant Inspector
The Day and the Hour (1963) - Pat Riley
Symphonie pour un massacre (1963) - Un client américain
Le Quatrième Sexe (1963) - (uncredited)
Blague dans le coin (1963) - Lieutenant Smith
The Counterfeit Constable (1964) - Le psychiatre
Bob Morane (1964-1965, TV Series) - Bill Ballantine
Up from the Beach (1965) - Colonel in bunker
Pleins feux sur Stanislas (1965) - L'espion américain
Les Bons Vivants (1965) - James J. Gordon, le client texan (segment "Procès, Le") (uncredited)
Gendarme in New York (1965) - Le lieutenant de police
Is Paris Burning? (1966) - Patton Aide (uncredited)
Atout coeur à Tokyo pour OSS 117 (1966) - M. Smith
Shock Troops (1967) - Hoffer
Les grandes vacances (1967) - Le conducteur du car
Playtime (1967) - Mr. Schultz
Patton (1970) - Officer Callagher (uncredited)
The Time to Die (1970) - Helmut
Bed and Board (1970) - Mr. Max
Et qu'ça saute! (1970)
Trop petit mon ami (1970) - Wanassee
Atlantic Wall (1970) - Commandant du Camp
Ils (1970) - Wesley
The Love Mates (1970) - Barry / l'acheteur américain-the American buyer
Supergirl (1971, TV Movie) - Himself
The Married Couple of the Year Two (1971) - Le beau-père
Qu'est-ce qui fait courir les crocodiles? (1971) - Sitting
Le mataf (1972)
Le désir et la volupté (1973) - Le producteur
Gross Paris (1974)
The Destructors (1974) - Card Player #1
Les murs ont des oreilles (1974) - Le producteur américain
Soldat Duroc, ça va être ta fête! (1975) - L'officier américain (uncredited)
L'Année sainte (1976) - Le pilote de l'avion
Marathon Man (1976) - Tourist Couple #1
Man in a Hurry (1977) - Freeman
The Fabulous Adventures of Baron Munchausen (1979) - (English version, voice)
Les Borsalini (1980) - Le boss
Qu'est-ce qui fait craquer les filles... (1982) - Customer with cigar
Enigma (1982)
On l'appelle Catastrophe (1983) - Fredo
Just the Way You Are (1984) - Earl Cooper
Asterix Versus Caesar (1985) - Obélix (English version, voice)
Asterix in Britain (1986) - Obelix (English version, voice)
À notre regrettable époux (1988)
Génération oxygène (1991) - M. Newman (final film role)

References

External links

1923 births
1992 deaths
Male actors from Seattle
Deaths from lung cancer
Deaths from cancer in Switzerland
United States Army personnel of World War II